Athanasios 'Thanasis' Dinas (born 12 November 1989) is a Greek professional footballer who plays as a winger for Super League 2 club Pierikos.

Career
Dinas began his professional career at Xanthi. He was then loaned at Zakynthos In 2010, Dinas signed with Panachaiki. He stayed there for 3 years.
On 31 January 2013, he signed with Panathinaikos in a three and a half years deal. He made his debut in a match against Aris, in which Panathinaikos lost 1–0. On 2 January 2014, he renew his contract with Panathinaikos till the summer of 2017.

With the purchase of Nikos Kaltsas from Veria, Dinas could not find a place in the Panathinaikos roster, but undoubtedly could be an excellent solution for the other Superleague clubs. The 25-year-old received several proposals but Platanias seems to be his next club. Dinas is expected to travel to Crete in order to negotiate the final details and sign his new contract, as a free transfer and not as a loan.

On 7 September 2017 Football League side Trikala announced the signing of Dinas.

On 22 January 2018, following his release from Trikala, he joined OFI on a 6-month contract, with an option for an additional year. On 25 February 2018 he scored his first goal for the club in a 2–0 home win against Panserraikos. On 17 March 2018 he scored two goals, both with free-kicks, in a 3–1 away win against Kallithea. One week later he scored one goal and gave one assist in an impressive 4–2 home win against Ergotelis, despite his team being down by two goals in the first five minutes. On 21 April 2018 he opened the score in an eventual 1–1 away draw against Kissamikos. Five days later he scored a brace in an emphatic 7–0 home win against Panegialios. On 29 April 2018 he scored with a penalty in a 1–0 away win against Apollon Pontou, which sealed the team's return to the Superleague after 4 years of absence. On 13 May 2018 he scored two goals in a 2–1 away win against Karaiskakis. On 28 May 2018, the team's administration officially announced the renewal of his contract for an additional season.

On 5 October 2020, Papazoglou signed a contract with Greek club Xanthi F.C. for an undisclosed fee.

Career statistics
As of 19 May 2021

(* includes Europa League, Champions League)
(**Superleague Greece Play-offs and Football League Play-offs)

Honours
Panathinaikos
 Greek Cup: 2014

References

1989 births
Living people
Greek footballers
Super League Greece players
Super League Greece 2 players
Football League (Greece) players
Xanthi F.C. players
Panachaiki F.C. players
Panathinaikos F.C. players
Platanias F.C. players
Trikala F.C. players
OFI Crete F.C. players
Veria NFC players
Footballers from Komotini
Association football wingers
21st-century Greek people